The Honda CB125TD Super Dream is a  air-cooled, four stroke, twin cylinder motorcycle manufactured by the Honda Motor Company between 1982 and 1988, in three designations, TDC, TDE and TDJ.

The machine was equipped with capacitor discharge electronic ignition, disc front and drum rear brakes and Comstar wheels. It had electric start and both centre and side stands. Electrics were 12-volt, and the battery was housed in a recess in the airbox. A compartment in the tailpiece contained a small toolkit. Instrumentation was by way of a handlebar mounted cluster. This contained a tachometer, warning lights for main beam, ignition/neutral and indicators, and a speedometer in miles per hour, with markings for kilometres, plus an odometer.

References

CB125TD Super Dream
Motorcycles introduced in 1982
Standard motorcycles
Motorcycles powered by straight-twin engines